The Wiltshire cure is a traditional English technique for curing bacon and ham. The technique originated in the 18th century in Calne, Wiltshire; it was developed by the Harris family. Originally it was a dry cure method that involved applying salt to the meat for 10–14 days. Storing the meat in cold rooms meant that less salt was needed. The Wiltshire cure has been a wet cure, soaking the meat in brine for 4–5 days, since the First World War. Smoking is not part of the process, although bacon is often smoked after being cured.

History
In 2010, several large British supermarket chains signed a voluntary code agreeing to use clearer labelling on pork products to avoid confusion over country of origin. For shops under this agreement, pork products sold in the UK that are labelled with "Wiltshire Cure" should only have been sourced from the UK.

References
Footnotes

Sources

Bacon
Food preservation
Wiltshire cuisine